Callaghan Innovation, a Crown entity of New Zealand, has the task of making New Zealand business more innovative. It was established in February 2013 and Industrial Research Limited, a Crown Research Institute, was merged into it. The institute takes its name from Sir Paul Callaghan, a prominent New Zealand physicist who died in 2012.

Mary Quin became the first CEO, in May 2013, and resigned in July 2016. Victoria Crone started as CEO on 28 February 2017 and resigned in July 2021. Stefan Korn became the acting CEO and was then appointed CEO in September 2022.

On 6 January 2014 the departments of carbohydrate chemistry and high temperature superconductors were ceded to Victoria University of Wellington, being renamed the Ferrier and Robinson Research Institutes respectively. This resulted in a transfer of 55 staff.

Notable staff 

 Juliet Gerrard – biochemist 
 Peter Beck – founder of Rocket Lab

References

External links
Callaghan Innovation

2013 establishments in New Zealand
Crown Research Institutes of New Zealand